Giovanni Luigi Malvezzi de' Medici (Bologna, September 10, 1819 – Ozzano dell’Emilia, October 3, 1892) was a politician, patriot, and Italian scholar.

Biography
Malvezzi was born to a family from Bologna, son of Count Francesco and Countess Teresa Carniani Malvezzi. He married Barbara Pio di Savoia Scapinelli, born in Modena on October 8, 1823; and was widowed February 28, 1848. He remarried on September 20, 1849 to Augusta Tanari (April 2, 1831 – March 27, 1886). Malvezzi and Tanari had 5 children together, including Senator Nerio. Malvezzi died at his villa in Ozzano dell’Emilia October 3, 1892.

Political life
During his youth he was persecuted by the Papal authorities for his liberal political ideas. He participated and helped finance the uprising of 1848 and 1849 where he was appointed Chief of State of the Civic Guard of Bologna. In 1859 he played a prominent part in the military movements that drove the Austrians from Bologna, and was among the citizens that dealt with the surrender of the Austrian troops (April 18, 1859). He included in the surrender agreements the condition that the officers had to leave their swords.

On June 12, after the departure of the Papal legate, he was named to the council of the provisional government council. This council represented the interests of the moderates, and of the liberals allied to Marco Minghetti. The council supported the referendum for to unite Bologna with Savoia. After the overwhelming support for the union in the referendum, the council worked under the leadership of Massimo d’Azeglio. Giovanni Malvezzi was then made president of the municipal commission of Bologna, as well as councilor of state for the government of  Romagna. On September 3, 1859 he was elected the Major General Commander of the National Guard of Bologna.

On March 18, 1860 the provinces of Bologna we annexed to the Kingdom of Sardinia, and on that date Vittorio Emanuele II appointed Malvezzi to the post as Senator, but he rarely attended meetings of the senate. Again in 1872 he became the Mayor of Bologna, and later stayed as provincial councilor. During this time he kept in close contact with Minghetti, who represented the city. He was also the chairman of many charitable and cultural institutions in Bologna: L’Istituto di Belle Arti and Congregazione di Beneficenza and the Ricovero di Mendicità. After his death he was commemorated in the Senate by the Senate president Luigi Carlo Farini, and was given a marble bust in the Palazzo Comunale of Bologna.

Titles and honors
 Noble of Bologna
 Heraldry consult recognizes his title of Count, which his family used for many generations, also at official levels.
 In 1891 he was awarded the honorary of Marquis of Castle Guelfo, another branch of his family.
 Noble of the Republic of San Marino
 Commander of the Ordine dei Santi Maurizio e Lazzaro: October 5, 1862
 Commander of the Ordine della Corona d’Italia: October 15, 1871
 Grand Official of the Ordine del Cristo di Portogallo
 Commander of the Ordine dell’Aquila Rossa di Germania

Artistic patronage
In 1852 he commissioned decoration of the main rooms of his palazzo in Bologna, today the seat of the province. In particular, he had several ceiling frescoes by Francesco Cocchi and Andrea Pesci and the perspective background of the Council Chamber by Onorato Zanotti. In the pink room, Girolamo Dal Pane frescoed the great poets of antiquity and also a scene from the Decameron. While the red room is decorated with a Danza delle Ore, as well as luxurious Murano glass chandeliers.

Bibliography
AAVV, Malvezzi, storia genealogia e iconografia, Bologna 1996

External links
  Biografia e bibliografia di Giovanni Luigi Malvezzi de' Medici su Archiweb – Raccolte digitali della Biblioteca dell'Archiginnasio di Bologna
  Storia amministrativa di Bologna
  Ritratto su Facies - Biblioteca dell'Archiginnasio
 https://web.archive.org/web/20060608095717/http://bellquel.bo.cnr.it/attivita/provbo/principa.html

1819 births
1892 deaths
Nobility from Bologna
Members of the Senate of the Kingdom of Sardinia
Members of the Senate of the Kingdom of Italy
Mayors of Bologna